James Archibald Douglas (born 1866) was the first professor of English and History at Government College, Agra. He is mainly remembered for having investigated, and debunked, the claims of Nicolas Notovitch regarding a secret record of Jesus' visit to India being found at the Hemis Monastery. Douglas made his own visit to the monastery in 1895, and published his findings in the journal Nineteenth Century. These findings were then publicized in the New York Times on 19 April.

Douglas was born in Sheffield, and was the tutor and friend of the young Aleister Crowley.

References

1866 births
Year of death missing
People from Sheffield